Live In São Paulo is the CD and Live On 3 Continents is the DVD live album by the Power metal band Helloween released in February 2007, recorded in São Paulo (Brazil), Sofia (Bulgaria) and Tokyo (Japan).

CD

Track listing

Disc one

Disc two

DVD

Track listing

Disc one

 "Intro" (São Paulo)
 "The King For A 1000 Years" (São Paulo)
 "Eagle Fly Free" (São Paulo)
 "Hell Was Made In Heaven" (São Paulo)
 "Keeper Of The Seven Keys" (São Paulo - alternative view Sofia)
 "A Tale That Wasn't Right" (São Paulo - alternative view Sofia)
 "Drum Solo" (Edit from São Paulo, Sofia and Tokyo)
 "Mr. Torture" (São Paulo - alternative view Tokyo)
 "If I Could Fly" (São Paulo)
 "Guitar Solo" (Edit from São Paulo, Sofia and Tokyo)
 "Power" (São Paulo)
 "Future World" (São Paulo)
 "The Invisible Man" (São Paulo)
 "Mrs. God" (São Paulo)
 "I Want Out" (São Paulo - alternative view Sofia)
 "Dr. Stein" (São Paulo - alternative view Tokyo)
 "Outro" (São Paulo)

Disc two

 "Occasion Avenue" (Tokyo)
 "Halloween" (Masters Of Rock, Vizovice CZ)
 Roadmovie
 Interviews
 "Mrs. God" (Video Clip)
 "Light The Universe" (Video Clip)

Credits 

 Andi Deris - Vocals
 Michael Weikath - Guitars
 Sascha Gerstner - Guitars
 Markus Grosskopf - Bass
 Dani Löble - Drums

References 

Helloween albums
2007 live albums
SPV/Steamhammer live albums
Live video albums
2007 video albums
SPV/Steamhammer video albums